The dental fricative or interdental fricative is a fricative consonant pronounced with the tip of the tongue against the teeth.  There are several types (those used in English being written as th):

Voiced dental fricative  - as in the English this, .
Voiceless dental fricative  - as in the English thin, .
Dental ejective fricative

See also
 Pronunciation of English ⟨th⟩

References

Fricative consonants
Dental consonants